Willy the Private Detective is a 1960 West German comedy film directed by Rudolf Schündler and starring Willy Millowitsch, Renate Mannhardt and Rudolf Platte.

Cast
 Willy Millowitsch as Willy Nölles
 Renate Mannhardt as Erna Knörschkes
 Rudolf Platte as Gottfried Bohnen
 Claus Biederstaedt as Dr. Werner Meyer
 Gusti Wolf as Mariechen
 Franz Schneider as Juppi Wenders
 Lotti Krekel as Elli Nölles
 Hannelore Auer as Helga Dobbelmann
 Emmy Burg as Frau Schürenberg
 Friedrich Schoenfelder as Direktor Schieske
 Harry Hardt as Direktor Dobbelmann
 Kurt Großkurth as Ernst Abelmann
 Klaus Dahlen as Walter Schneppe
 Käte Jaenicke as Köchin
 Egon Brosig as Polizeipräsident
 Anneliese Hartnack as Frau des Polizeipräsidenten
 Rolf Weih as Dr. Oliver
 Barbara Saade as Vera - Helgas Freundin

References

Bibliography
 Bock, Hans-Michael & Bergfelder, Tim. The Concise CineGraph. Encyclopedia of German Cinema. Berghahn Books, 2009.

External links 
 

1960 films
1960 comedy films
German comedy films
West German films
1960s German-language films
Films directed by Rudolf Schündler
Films set in Cologne
UFA GmbH films
1960s German films